The Sullivant Land Office is a historic building in the East Franklinton neighborhood of Columbus, Ohio. It was listed on the National Register of Historic Places in 1973 and the Columbus Register of Historic Properties, along with the Gen. William Henry Harrison Headquarters, in 1985. The small brick building was built c. 1822. Its original use was as a single-room real estate office, although it was later expanded. At the time of construction, Lucas Sullivant was selling and giving away pieces of land, and Franklinton became the county seat of Franklin County. The building is the only remaining structure associated with Lucas Sullivant in the Franklinton area. In the early 1980s, the Columbus Recreation and Parks Department moved the building from its original location at 714 W. Gay St. to 13 N Gift St., behind the William Henry Harrison house. The move was prompted because the building was endangered in its original location, with vandalism, deterioration, and plans to create a parking lot for a car dealership on the site.

See also
 National Register of Historic Places listings in Columbus, Ohio

References

External links
 

Houses on the National Register of Historic Places in Ohio
Federal architecture in Ohio
Houses completed in 1822
Houses in Columbus, Ohio
National Register of Historic Places in Columbus, Ohio
Franklinton (Columbus, Ohio)
Columbus Register properties
Vernacular architecture in Ohio